Srđan Jeković (born 17 October 1967) is a Serbian professional basketball coach and former player.

Playing career 
During his playing days, Jeković played for his hometown clubs Železničar and Borac, as well as Kolubara, Beopetrol, AZS UMK Toruń (Poland), S.C. Lusitânia (Portugal), and Prokupac. He retired as a player with Prokupac in 2003.

Coaching career 
After retirement in 2003, Jeković was as a coach of the Belgrade-based club AS Basket. In 2007, he became the head coach of Kolubara LA 2003. Two years later, he was added as an assistant coach of Aleksandar Trifunović to the Crvena zvezda coaching staff. Thereafter, he coached U19 Mega Vizura, Novi Beograd 7, and BASK. He had the second stint with Kolubara during the 2015–2016 season.

Career achievements 
As coach
 First Regional League of Serbia champion: 1 (with Kolubara LA 2003: 2015–16)
 Second Regional League of Serbia champion: 1 (with Kolubara LA 2003: 2007–08)

Personal life 
His son Bratislav (born 1996) is a professional basketball player who played for FMP, Mladost Zemun, Tamiš, and Dunav. His daughter Ana (born 1997) is a professional volleyball player who played for Vizura, and Crvena Zvezda.

References

External links 
 Srđan Jeković at eurobasket.com

1967 births
Living people
Basketball players from Čačak
KK AS Basket coaches
KK Beopetrol/Atlas Beograd players
KK Borac Čačak players
KK Kolubara players
KK Železničar Čačak players
KK Crvena zvezda assistant coaches
KK BASK coaches
KK Kolubara coaches
OKK Beograd coaches
Serbian men's basketball coaches
Serbian men's basketball players
Serbian expatriate basketball people in Poland
Serbian expatriate basketball people in Portugal
Yugoslav men's basketball players